Mikhail Shishkin may refer to
Mikhail Shishkin (footballer) (born 1980), Russian association football player
Mikhail Shishkin (writer) (born 1961), Russian writer